Armada Towers is a complex of three skyscrapers in Jumeirah Lake Towers (JLT) Dubai Multi Commodities Centre Free Zone being built is opposite to the Dubai Marina and next to the Emirates Golf Club in Dubai, United Arab Emirates. It is a mixed purpose community with both residential, hotel,  hospital and commercial units.

General
Armada Towers is one of Armada Group projects in the UAE. The construction contract was awarded to CSHK and the total cost of the project estimated to be over AED 1 Billion (US$300 Million). The construction began in early 2005 and was completed in 2009.

The Towers was designed by Adnan Saffarini.

Armada Tower 1

Located in Cluster P, plot 1.

Armada Tower 2 

Located in Cluster P, plot 2.

Armada Tower 3 

Located in cluster P, plot 3. Armada Tower 3 is a Luxury Residential Tower providing Apartments in Jumeirah Lakes Towers. There are number of retail shops operating out of the same building such as Zaiyna Laundry & Dry Cleaning, Costa Coffee,  MMI, Cavallo Nero Gents Salon.

Photo gallery

See also

 List of tallest buildings in Dubai

External links
 http://www.armadatowers.com
 http://www.armadaholding.com

References

Residential buildings completed in 2009
Skyscraper hotels in Dubai
Skyscraper office buildings in Dubai
Residential skyscrapers in Dubai